Ectoedemia stimulata is a moth of the family Nepticulidae. It was described by Edward Meyrick in 1913. It is known from South Africa (it was described from what was then Transvaal province).

References

Endemic moths of South Africa
Nepticulidae
Moths of Africa
Moths described in 1913